Corning Community School District is a school district headquartered in Corning, Iowa. Along with the Villisca Community School District, it has the branding "Southwest Valley Schools".

The district is in parts of Adams and Taylor counties, and serves Corning and Carbon.

It operates Corning Elementary School and Southwest Valley High School in Corning. The district sends its students to Southwest Valley Middle School, operated by Villisca SD. The two districts also share superintendents.

History
The district previously operated Corning High School. 

On July 1, 2008, the district absorbed portions of the former New Market Community School District.

By 2011, the process of establishing a grade-sharing agreement with Villisca was under way. A feasibility study conducted that year by Dr. Robert Decker of the University of Northern Iowa recommended doing the grade-sharing between Corning and Villisca.

References

Further reading

External links
 Southwest Valley Schools - joint website operated by the Corning and Villisca districts
 
School districts in Iowa
Education in Adams County, Iowa
Education in Taylor County, Iowa